The 1977–78 Detroit Red Wings season was the Red Wings' 46th season, 52nd overall for the franchise.

Regular season

Final standings

Schedule and results

Player statistics

Regular season
Scoring

Goaltending

Playoffs
Scoring

Goaltending

Note: GP = Games played; G = Goals; A = Assists; Pts = Points; +/- = Plus-minus PIM = Penalty minutes; PPG = Power-play goals; SHG = Short-handed goals; GWG = Game-winning goals;
      MIN = Minutes played; W = Wins; L = Losses; T = Ties; GA = Goals against; GAA = Goals-against average;  SO = Shutouts;

Transactions
The Red Wings were involved in the following transactions during the 1977–78 season.

Trades

Free Agents

Draft picks
Detroit's picks at the 1977 NHL amateur draft in Mount Royal Hotel in Montreal, Quebec.

See also
1977–78 NHL season

References

Detroit Red Wings seasons
Detroit
Detroit
Detroit Red
Detroit Red